The Jugendbund der NSDAP was a youth organisation attached to the Nazi Party and a predecessor to the Hitler Youth. It was effectively the youth section of the Sturmabteilung (SA, or Storm Troopers) and it existed between 1922 and 1923 when the Nazi Party was banned following the failed Munich Putsch. It contained three sections:

Jungmannschaften: boys aged 14 to 16 years
Jungsturm Adolf Hitler: 16 to 18 years old
The organisation also had a girls wing.

References
Notes

Organizations based in the Weimar Republic
Hitler Youth
Historical youth organisations based in Germany
Youth organizations established in 1922
Organizations disestablished in 1923